Muhammed Demirci (born 3 January 1995) is a Turkish professional footballer who plays as a midfielder for Tuzlaspor.

He signed his first professional contract with Beşiktaş through the 2010–2011 season and played his first match against Gaziantep Büyükşehir Belediyespor on 3 March 2011.

Career

Beşiktaş JK

On 11 October 2010, Demirci signed a three-year professional contract with Beşiktaş.

Ibrahim Toraman said, "He is a very young and talented football player. We already know his talents. But Mami is weak. It is necessary that he gains strength to be able to play on a regular basis. Now, football is a game based on more power."

Necip Uysal added, "He must strengthen his muscles. To do this extra work, time and patience is needed." In the 2010–2011 season Muhammed opted for the number 80, also worn by Ronaldinho who wore the number while playing for Milan. He also chose the number 80 because when he made his Super Lig debut on 1 April 2012 against Samsunspor, he entered the pitch in the 80th minute as a substitute for Veli Kavlak. At the end of the match he said: "The first match got very excited to play. When the coach decided to use me made me happy. Despite the loss we played a good match. We had to take risks after we were behind. We are sorry for the defeat." He scored his first goal on 24 July 2012 against Jagiellonia Białystok in a preparation match that ended 1–1.

Royal Mouscron-Péruwelz

In August 2015, Demirci agreed with Belgian club Royal Mouscron-Péruwelz for four years.

Career statistics

Professional career

Semi-Pro Career

References

External links
 
 
 

1995 births
Living people
People from Göynücek
Turkish footballers
Turkish expatriate footballers
Beşiktaş J.K. footballers
Gaziantep F.K. footballers
Royal Excel Mouscron players
İstanbulspor footballers
24 Erzincanspor footballers
Şanlıurfaspor footballers
Süper Lig players
TFF First League players
TFF Second League players
Turkey youth international footballers
Turkey under-21 international footballers
Association football midfielders
Turkish expatriate sportspeople in Belgium
Expatriate footballers in Belgium